Ibrahim Bezghoudi (born 7 June 1983) is a Moroccan international footballer who plays as a striker. He is a free agent who played most recently for Ittihad Tanger.

Honours

Club
Olympique Khouribga
Moroccan Throne Cup: 2016

References

1983 births
Living people
Moroccan footballers
Ittihad Tanger players
Association football forwards